Hungary is a European Parliament constituency for elections in the European Union covering the member state of Hungary. It is currently represented by twenty-one Members of the European Parliament.

Current Members of the European Parliament

Electoral system 
Hungary uses closed-list type of party-list proportional representation to elect MEPs with the D'Hondt method of allocating seats to parties.

Elections

2004

The 2004 European election was the sixth election to the European Parliament. As Hungary had only joined the European Union earlier that month, it was the first election European election held in that state. The election took place on 13 June 2004.

2009

The 2009 European election was the seventh election to the European Parliament and the second for Hungary. The number of seats was reduced to twenty–two.

2014

The 2014 European election was the eighth election to the European Parliament and the third for Hungary. The number of seats was reduced to twenty–one.

2019

The 2019 European election was the ninth election to the European Parliament and the fourth for Hungary.

References

External links
 European Election News by European Election Law Association (Eurela)
 List of MEPs europarl.europa.eu

European Parliament elections in Hungary
European Parliament constituencies
2004 establishments in Hungary
Constituencies established in 2004